Stephenson Nyamau (born 20 November 1971) is a retired Kenyan long-distance runner.

At the 1991 World Cross Country Championships he finished sixth in the long race, and won a gold medal for Kenya in the team competition. He also won the bronze medal in the junior category in 1989.

References

External links

1971 births
Living people
Kenyan male long-distance runners
Kenyan male cross country runners